Pyrindus or Pyrindos (Πύρινδος) was a town of ancient Caria, cited by Stephanus of Byzantium. It was a polis (city-state).
 
Its site is unlocated.

References

Populated places in ancient Caria
Former populated places in Turkey
Greek city-states
Lost ancient cities and towns